The Iranian ambassador in Kabul is the official representative of the Government in Tehran to the Government of Afghanistan.

List of representatives

See also
Afghanistan–Iran relations

References 

 
Afghanistan
Iran